Charles Henry Hulls (18 March 1861 – 19 December 1912) was an English cricketer who played first-class cricket for Somerset County Cricket Club and the Marylebone Cricket Club (MCC) in the late 1800s. He also made one appearance in the Minor Counties Championship for Oxfordshire.

A right-handed batsman and right-arm medium pace bowler, he made his debut in senior cricket for Somerset in 1885. He played for the MCC between 1889 and 1905, primarily in non first-class matches, though he did appear in their 1896 match against Cambridge University which was given first-class status. He generally appeared as a lower order batsman, but rarely bowled.

References

1861 births
1912 deaths
English cricketers
Marylebone Cricket Club cricketers
Oxfordshire cricketers
Cricketers from Luton
Somerset cricketers